John Keith Vernon (born Adolphus Raymondus Vernon Agopsowicz; February 24, 1932 February 1, 2005) was a Canadian actor. He made a career in Hollywood after achieving initial television stardom in Canada. He was best known for playing Dean Wormer in Animal House, the Mayor in Dirty Harry and Fletcher in The Outlaw Josey Wales.

Personal life
Born as Adolphus Raymondus Vernon Agopsowicz in Zehner, Saskatchewan, Vernon was one of two sons of Adolf Agopsowicz, a grocer, and his wife Eleonore Krückel (also spelled as Kriekle or Kriekel). Both his parents' families immigrated to the Edenwold district in the late 19th century from the Austrian crownland and duchy of Bukovina. The Agopsowicz family were part of the community of Armenians in Poland. Vernon was of Armenian, German, and Polish descent.

From 1935 to 1953 he attended St. Joseph's School and Campion College in Regina, Saskatchewan, where his acting career began under the direction of the Rev. Arthur Nelson, S.J. and Mary Ellen Burgess at the Regina Little Theatre. Vernon was educated at the Banff School of Fine Arts and the Royal Academy of Dramatic Art in London before becoming a live stage actor for CBC Television's dramatic programs. In 1974, he completed a season at The Royal Shakespeare Theatre in Stratford-Upon-Avon, England, playing Malvolio.

Vernon is the father of actress Kate Vernon, musician Nan Vernon, and actor Chris Vernon.

Career

Early roles
Vernon made his screen debut in 1956 as the voice of Big Brother in Michael Anderson's film version of George Orwell's 1984 starring Edmond O'Brien. He returned to Canada afterwards and gained film experience appearing on the TV series The Adventures of Tugboat Annie and The Last of the Mohicans.

He debuted on Broadway in 1964 as DeSoto opposite Christopher Plummer and David Carradine in The Royal Hunt of the Sun. During the Golden Age of CBC Drama in the 1960s, he co-starred in Edna O'Brien's A Cheap Bunch of Nice Flowers, opposite Colleen Dewhurst, and in Uncle Vanya, opposite William Hutt and Rita Gam. He appeared in the CBC series Wojeck in the late 1960s, playing a crime-fighting medical examiner. However, he decided to go to the United States to further his acting career.

In 1967, he appeared opposite Lee Marvin in Point Blank. 

In 1969, he played Cuban revolutionary Rico Parra in Alfred Hitchcock's Cold War-era spy movie Topaz. He appeared on The High Chaparral  as the leader of a group of striking Irish Miners (1969) in "No Irish Need Apply". 

In 1970, he guest-starred in the Hawaii Five-O episode "Force Of Waves" as Cal Anderson, and he appeared in the two-part episode "The Banker" of The Silent Force in 1971. In the late 1960s and early 1970s, he made four appearances over five years on the TV series Mission: Impossible as four different lead villains. In 1974, Vernon turned in a supporting performance in Mary Jane Harper Cried Last Night.

In 1971, he played the by-the-book mayor of San Francisco, perpetually frustrated by Clint Eastwood, in the first Dirty Harry movie. He later parodied this role in the film One More Train to Rob and the premiere episode of Sledge Hammer!.  

In 1974 he co-starred in the film The Black Windmill with Michael Caine and Donald Pleasence. Also in 1974, he appeared in The Questor Tapes.

In 1976, he played Fletcher in Eastwood's The Outlaw Josey Wales.

In 1977, he played the husband in the Italian film, A Special Day, with Sophia Loren and Marcello Mastroianni.

Villain

In 1972, he appeared as a villain in the Fear Is the Key and in 1973, he appeared in Charley Varrick as mob boss Maynard Boyle.

In 1975, Vernon portrayed Chicago gangster Ben Larkin in the John Wayne movie Brannigan, which was set in London, England, starring alongside Wayne and Richard Attenborough. 

Vernon played Dean Vernon Wormer of fictional Faber College in 1978's Animal House (a role that he would reprise in the short-lived television sequel Delta House). He also played Mr. Prindle in 1980's Herbie Goes Bananas, Ted Striker's psychiatrist Dr. Stone in 1982's Airplane II: The Sequel, and Sherman Krader in 1987's Ernest Goes to Camp.

In 1979, Vernon played villainous American bigot Jonathon Pritts in New Mexico who was trying to steal the land from Mexican landowners in the Louis L'Amour story of The Sacketts.

He also appeared in several cult exploitation and action films in the 1980s, most notably Chained Heat and Savage Streets, both starring Linda Blair, and Jungle Warriors, opposite Sybil Danning. He underplayed his villain image (playing a character called "Mr. Big") in the 1988 Blaxploitation spoof I'm Gonna Git You Sucka: a character thinks Vernon should be "above exploitation films" and Vernon replies that many famous actors have done exploitation films, listing Jamie Lee Curtis, Angie Dickinson, and Shelley Winters as examples.

Vernon played "Ted Jarrett" in the season two The A-Team episode "Labor Pains" (1983). Vernon also played "Cameron Zachary" in the season two Knight Rider episode "A Good Knight's Work" (1984). Vernon later played "John Bradford Horn" in the season three Airwolf episode "Discovery" (1986). 

In 1986, he played the Principal in Fuzz Bucket. He played Sergeant Curt Mooney in Killer Klowns from Outer Space and was a lead in the short-lived 1990s series Acapulco H.E.A.T.

Vernon guest-starred as the grouchy principal Dinkler in "Brad to Worse", an episode of Duckman on USA Network.

Voice work
Vernon did extensive voice work. He voiced the Prosecutor on the 1981 animated film Heavy Metal. He worked on animated TV series such as The Marvel Super Heroes portraying Tony Stark/Iron Man and Sub-Mariner among others, Batman: The Animated Series, The Incredible Hulk, Wildfire, Spider-Man, The Grim Adventures of Billy & Mandy and Delgo.

Death
Vernon died of complications following heart surgery on February 1, 2005, in Westwood, Los Angeles at the age of 72. He was cremated after a private funeral service.

Selected filmography

 1984 (1956) as Big Brother (uncredited)
 Nobody Waved Good-bye (1964) as Lot Supervisor
 Point Blank (1967) as Mal Reese
 Bonanza (1968 TV) as Yonder Man
 Justine (1969) as Nessim
 Tell Them Willie Boy Is Here (1969) as George Hacker
 Topaz (1969) as Rico Parra
 Mission Impossible (1969-1972) as Colonel Josef Strom, General Ramon Sabattini, Ramone Fuego, Norman Shields 
 One More Train to Rob (1971) as Timothy Xavier Nolan
 Face-Off (1971) as Fred Wares
 Dirty Harry (1971) as The Mayor
 Bearcats! (1971) as Jason Ryker in episode 1, "The Devil Wears Armor"
 Journey (1972) as Boulder Allin
 Fear Is the Key (1972) as Vyland
 Cannon (1972–1975), 2x14 Hard Rock Roller Coaster, 3x07 Night Flight To Murder, 4x19 The Set Up, 5x13/14 The Star
 Six Million Dollar Man: The Solid Gold Kidnapping (1973) as Julian Peck
 Charley Varrick (1973) as Maynard Boyle
 Hunter (1973) as David Hunter
 More Joy in Heaven (1973) as Kip Caley
 The Questor Tapes (1974) as Geoffrey Darrow
 Sweet Movie (1974) as Aristote Alplanalpe, a.k.a. M. Kapital
 The Black Windmill (1974) as McKee
 W (1974) as Arnie Felson
 Brannigan (1975) as Larkin
 Gunsmoke (1975) as Oliver Harker
 Swiss Family Robinson (1975) as Charles Forsythe
 The Outlaw Josey Wales (1976) as Fletcher
 Drum (1976) (scenes deleted)
 A Special Day (1977) as Emanuele, the husband of Antonietta
 The Uncanny (1977) as Pomeroy (segment "Hollywood 1936")
 Angela (1978) as Ben Kincaid
 Golden Rendezvous (1977) as Luis Carreras
 National Lampoon's Animal House (1978) as Dean Vernon Wormer
 It Rained All Night the Day I Left (1980) as Killian
 Fantastica (1980) as Jim McPherson
 Herbie Goes Bananas (1980) as Prindle
 The Kinky Coaches and the Pom Pom Pussycats (1981) as Coach 'Bulldog' Malone
 Airplane II: The Sequel (1982) as Dr. Stone
 Curtains (1983) as Jonathan Stryker
 Chained Heat (1983) as Warden Bacman
 The Blood of Others (1984) as Charles
 Jungle Warriors (1984) as Vito Mastranga
 Savage Streets (1984) as Principal Underwood
 Fraternity Vacation (1985) as Chief Ferret
 Doin' Time (1985) as Big Mac
 Rat Tales (1986)
 Terminal Exposure (1987) as Mr. Karrothers
 Ernest Goes to Camp (1987) as Sherman Krader
 Blue Monkey (1987) as Roger Levering
 Dixie Lanes (1988) as Elmer Sinclair
 Killer Klowns from Outer Space (1988) as Curtis Mooney
 Deadly Stranger (1988) as Mr. Mitchell
 Two Men (1988) as Alex Koves
 Office Party (1988) as Mayor
 I'm Gonna Git You Sucka (1988) as Mr. Big
 Afganistan - The last war bus (L'ultimo bus di guerra) (1989) as Ken Ross
 Mob Story (1989) as Don "Luce" Luciano
 Object of Desire (1990)
 The Naked Truth (1992) as Von Bulo
 Malicious (1995) as Detective Pronzini
 The Gnomes' Great Adventure (1995) as Omar / Master Ghost (voice)
 Stageghost (2000) as Slim
 Sorority Boys (2002) as Old Man
 Welcome to America (2002) as Det. Golding

Animation

References

External links
 

1932 births
2005 deaths
20th-century Canadian male actors
21st-century Canadian male actors
Alumni of RADA
Canadian expatriate male actors in the United States
Canadian male film actors
Canadian male television actors
Canadian male voice actors
Canadian people of Armenian descent
Canadian people of German descent
Canadian people of Polish descent
Male actors from Saskatchewan